My Hero may refer to:

Film 
 My Hero (1912 film), a Western directed by D. W. Griffith
 My Hero (1920 film), an animated Felix the Cat film
 My Hero (1990 film), a Hong Kong action film starring Stephen Chow

Television 
 My Hero (American TV series), a 1950s sitcom starring Robert Cummings
 My Hero (British TV series), a 2000s sitcom starring Ardal O'Hanlon and James Dreyfus
 My Hero (Chinese TV series), a talent competition, won in 2007 by Jing Boran
 "My Hero" (The Jeffersons), an episode
 "My Hero" (Modern Family), an episode
 "My Hero" (Scrubs), an episode
 "My Hero?", an episode of I Dream of Jeannie

Music 
 My Hero, a 2015 album by Greta Bradman

Songs
 "My Hero" (song), by Foo Fighters, 1997
 "My Hero", by the Blue Notes
 "My Hero", by Level 42 from True Colours
 "My Hero", by Stereophonics from Keep the Village Alive
 "Mein Held!" ("My Hero!"), composed by Oscar Straus for the 1908 operetta The Chocolate Soldier

Other uses
 My Hero (video game), a 1985 Sega beat 'em up game
 My Hero, a 1996 novel by Tom Holt
 The My Hero Project, a non-profit organization

See also 
 
 
 My Hero Academia, a 2014 manga by Kōhei Horikoshi